Charles Brenneman (born February 9, 1981) is a former American mixed martial artist and currently is a motivational speaker. A professional from 2007 until 2014, he competed for the UFC, ShoXC, and was the winner of the first season of the television show Pros vs Joes.

Background
Brenneman was born to Charles and Marie Brenneman in Hollidaysburg, Pennsylvania, the youngest of the four Brenneman children. He wrestled throughout his elementary and high school career. Upon graduating from Hollidaysburg Area High School in 1999, Brenneman attended Lock Haven University, where he continued wrestling and finished his collegiate wrestling career with a Top-12 finish at Nationals.

Brenneman earned his Bachelor of Arts in Secondary Education/Spanish from Lock Haven University, and returned to his hometown to teach Spanish at his former high school for three years, which is where his nickname 'the Spaniard' came from. He continued his education, earning his Master of Arts from East Stroudsburg University of Pennsylvania in Sports Management.  It was during the first season of the Pros vs Joes game show when he first received national public attention. He was unexpectedly cast after submitting his application to participate in the reality game show, but he won the competition alongside his older brother Ben. Following his victory on the Pros vs. Joes show, Brenneman resigned from his high school teaching job to pursue a mixed martial arts fighting career.

Fighting career
During his amateur career, Brenneman compiled a 5–0 undefeated record. In an attempt to maintain his momentum, he quickly turned professional, debuting on July 28, 2007, against Marcello Olivera.  Brenneman also earned a 5–0 record at the professional level through early 2008, with a notable split-decision victory over Drew Puzon at the ShoXC event on January 25, 2008.

2008 injury and AMA Fight Club
During a sparring session with one-time UFC fighter Chris Liguori, Brenneman sustained a kick to the face that shattered his left orbital and forced him to undergo emergency surgery to repair the damage. Vertical and lateral plates were inserted into his face, and he eventually regained vision in his left eye. Brenneman made his comeback to competition on September 12, 2008, against John Howard, but suffered the first loss of his career. Because of the defeat, the self-trained Brenneman decided to join the AMA Fight Club, and went on to win his next six bouts before being offered a contract for the Ultimate Fighting Championship (UFC).

Ultimate Fighting Championship
Brenneman made his UFC debut on the preliminary card of UFC Fight Night: Florian vs. Gomi against Jason High, whom he defeated via unanimous decision (30–27, 30–27, 29–28).

In his next fight, Brenneman lost to Johny Hendricks at UFC 117 via TKO in the second round.

Brenneman faced Amilcar Alves on January 22, 2011, at UFC Fight Night 23. He won the fight via unanimous decision.

Brenneman was scheduled to fight T. J. Grant on June 26, 2011 at UFC on Versus 4, but Grant had to pull out due to illness and the fight was scrapped. However, just hours before the weigh-ins it was reported that Nate Marquardt did not receive medical clearance and had to pull out of his bout against Rick Story. As a result, Brenneman fought Story in the evening's co-main event. Brenneman upset the favored Story, as Brenneman was able to out wrestle Story and control him on the ground while fending off multiple submission attempts in the third round en route to a unanimous decision victory. He later stated about his upset win, that he'd luckily been told about being Marquardt's replacement for this fight earlier than Story and was also training for a fight with Story as well because of this, just in case he turned out to be the replacement, which he was.

Brenneman lost to Anthony Johnson via first-round TKO due to a head kick on October 1, 2011 at UFC Live: Cruz vs. Johnson.

Brenneman next faced Daniel Roberts on January 20, 2012 at UFC on FX: Guillard vs. Miller. He won the fight via unanimous decision.

Brenneman faced Erick Silva on June 8, 2012 at UFC on FX 3 and lost via rear-naked choke near the end of the first round.

Brenneman was expected to face Kyle Noke on September 1, 2012 at UFC 151.  However, as a result of the cancellation of UFC 151, Noke/Brenneman was rescheduled for September 22, 2012 at UFC 152. Brenneman lost the fight in the first round via TKO due to punches. After the loss Brenneman was released from the promotion.

Post UFC
Brenneman cut down to 155 lbs. following his release from the UFC. Brenneman fought Eric Irvin at VFL 40 on Jan 19, 2013. He won via second round submission. Brenneman defeated Jeremy Castro and Gemiyale Adkins in the Cage Fury Fighting Championships, and would then defeat Kyle Baker by submission via arm-triangle choke for the vacant CFFC lightweight title.

Return to UFC
Brenneman returned to the UFC and faced promotional newcomer Beneil Dariush in a lightweight bout on January 15, 2014 at UFC Fight Night 35, replacing an injured Jason High.  Brenneman was quickly submitted in the first round via rear-naked choke, after being dropped by a left hand.

Brenneman faced Danny Castillo at UFC 172. After a back-and-forth first round, Brenneman lost via knockout early in the second round.

Brenneman faced Leandro Silva on November 8, 2014 at UFC Fight Night 56. Brenneman was submitted by a rear naked choke in the first round following multiple takedown attempts. After the loss Brenneman was again released from the promotion.

Personal life
Brenneman and his wife Amanda have a daughter named Gracie, born in 2013 and a son named Rocky, born in 2016.

Championship and accomplishments
Cage Fury Fighting Championships
CFFC Lightweight Championship (One time)
Ring of Combat
ROC Welterweight Championship (One time)
Valley Fight League
VFL Welterweight Championship (One time)

Mixed martial arts record

|-
| Loss
| align=center| 19–8
| Leandro Silva
| Submission (rear-naked choke)
| UFC Fight Night: Shogun vs. Saint Preux
| 
| align=center| 1
| align=center| 4:15
| Uberlândia, Brazil
| 
|-
| Loss
| align=center| 19–7
| Danny Castillo
| KO (punch)
| UFC 172
| 
| align=center| 2
| align=center| 0:21
| Baltimore, Maryland, United States
| 
|-
| Loss
| align=center| 19–6 
| Beneil Dariush
| Submission (rear-naked choke)
| UFC Fight Night: Rockhold vs. Philippou
| 
| align=center| 1
| align=center| 1:45
| Duluth, Georgia, United States
| 
|-
| Win
| align=center| 19–5
| Kyle Baker
| Submission (arm-triangle choke)
| CFFC 28: Brenneman vs. Baker
| 
| align=center| 2
| align=center| 4:07
| Atlantic City, New Jersey, United States
| 
|-
| Win
| align=center| 18–5
| Gemiyale Adkins
| Decision (unanimous)
| CFFC 25: Williams vs. Faunce
| 
| align=center| 3
| align=center| 5:00
| King of Prussia, Pennsylvania, United States
| 
|-
| Win
| align=center| 17–5
| Jeremy Castro
| Submission (Peruvian necktie)
| CFFC 23: La Nsang vs. Baker
| 
| align=center| 1
| align=center| 4:34
| King of Prussia, Pennsylvania, United States
| 
|-
| Win
| align=center| 16–5
| Eric Irvin
| Submission (rear-naked choke)
| VFL 40: Broad Avenue Brawlers
| 
| align=center| 2
| align=center| 2:09
| Altoona, Pennsylvania, United States
| 
|-
| Loss
| align=center| 15–5
| Kyle Noke
| TKO (punches)
| UFC 152
| 
| align=center| 1
| align=center| 0:45
| Toronto, Ontario, Canada
| 
|-
| Loss
| align=center| 15–4
| Erick Silva 
| Submission (rear-naked choke)
| UFC on FX: Johnson vs. McCall
| 
| align=center| 1
| align=center| 4:33
| Sunrise, Florida, United States
| 
|-
| Win
| align=center| 15–3
| Daniel Roberts 
| Decision (unanimous)
| UFC on FX: Guillard vs. Miller
| 
| align=center| 3
| align=center| 5:00
| Nashville, Tennessee, United States
| 
|-
| Loss
| align=center| 14–3
| Anthony Johnson 
| TKO (head kick)
| UFC Live: Cruz vs. Johnson
| 
| align=center| 1
| align=center| 2:49
| Washington D.C., United States
| 
|-
| Winl
| align=center| 14–2
| Rick Story
| Decision (unanimous)
| UFC Live: Kongo vs. Barry
| 
| align=center| 3
| align=center| 5:00
| Pittsburgh, Pennsylvania, United States
| 
|-
| Win
| align=center| 13–2
| Amilcar Alves
| Decision (unanimous)
| UFC: Fight For The Troops 2
| 
| align=center| 3
| align=center| 5:00
| Fort Hood, Texas, United States
| 
|-
| Loss
| align=center| 12–2
| Johny Hendricks
| TKO (punches)
| UFC 117
| 
| align=center| 2
| align=center| 0:40
| Oakland, California, United States
| 
|-
| Win
| align=center| 12–1
| Jason High
| Decision (unanimous)
| UFC Fight Night: Florian vs. Gomi
| 
| align=center| 3
| align=center| 5:00
| Charlotte, North Carolina, United States
| 
|-
| Win
| align=center| 11–1
| George Sheppard
| Submission (punches)
| VFL 23: Mason Dixon Showdown 2
| 
| align=center| 2
| align=center| 1:55
| Greencastle, Pennsylvania, United States
| 
|-
| Win
| align=center| 10–1
| Phillip Wyman
| TKO (punches)
| VFL 21: Broad Avenue Brawlers 2
| 
| align=center| 1
| align=center| 3:39
| Altoona, Pennsylvania, United States
| 
|-
| Win
| align=center| 9–1
| Mitch Whitesel
| Decision (unanimous)
| VFL 19: Broad Avenue Brawlers
| 
| align=center| 3
| align=center| 5:00
| Altoona, Pennsylvania, United States
| 
|-
| Win
| align=center| 8–1
| Chris Thomas
| Submission (arm-triangle choke)
| Iron Will Fighting Championship 1
| 
| align=center| 2
| align=center| 1:17
| Johnstown, Pennsylvania, United States
| 
|-
| Win
| align=center| 7–1
| Edward O'Daniel
| TKO (elbows)
| Extreme Challenge: The War at the Shore
| 
| align=center| 2
| align=center| 4:22
| Atlantic City, New Jersey, United States
| 
|-
| Win
| align=center| 6–1
| Yanish Dimitry
| TKO (punches)
| United States Fight League: War in the Woods 5
| 
| align=center| 1
| align=center| 4:50
| Ledyard, Connecticut, United States
| 
|-
| Loss
| align=center| 5–1
| John Howard
| Decision (unanimous)
| Ring of Combat 21
| 
| align=center| 3
| align=center| 5:00
| Atlantic City, New Jersey, United States
| 
|-
| Win
| align=center| 5–0
| Drew Puzon
| Decision (split)
| ShoXC: Elite Challenger Series
| 
| align=center| 3
| align=center| 5:00
| Atlantic City, New Jersey, United States
| 
|-
| Win
| align=center| 4–0
| Mark Berrocal
| TKO (punches)
| ROC 17: Beast of the Northeast Finals
| 
| align=center| 2
| align=center| 3:54
| Atlantic City, New Jersey, United States
| 
|-
| Win
| align=center| 3–0
| Joseph Aviles
| Decision (unanimous)
| ROC 16: Beast of the Northeast Semi-Finals
| 
| align=center| 3
| align=center| 4:00
| Atlantic City, New Jersey, United States
| 
|-
| Win
| align=center| 2–0
| Jordan Damon
| TKO (doctor stoppage)
| ROC 15: Beast of the Northeast Quarterfinals 
| 
| align=center| 1
| align=center| 2:20
| Atlantic City, New Jersey, United States
| 
|-
| Win
| align=center| 1–0
| Marcelo Oliveira
| Decision (unanimous)
| Extreme Challenge 81
| 
| align=center| 3
| align=center| 5:00
| West Orange, New Jersey, United States
|

See also
Hybrid martial arts
Mixed Martial Arts (MMA)
Ultimate Fighting Championship (UFC)
AMA Fight Club (MMA)

References

External links
Official UFC Profile

1981 births
Living people
American male mixed martial artists
Welterweight mixed martial artists
Mixed martial artists utilizing collegiate wrestling
Mixed martial artists utilizing Brazilian jiu-jitsu
Mixed martial artists from Pennsylvania
People from Hollidaysburg, Pennsylvania
Lightweight mixed martial artists
American practitioners of Brazilian jiu-jitsu
Ultimate Fighting Championship male fighters